This is a list of television shows set in the Las Vegas Valley:
{| class="wikitable sortable"
|- bgcolor=#cccccc
! First Run Start !! First Run End !! Title !! Network !! Studio!! Notes
|-
|| 2021 || || CSI:Vegas || CBS ||  || Crime drama series, based on CSI: Crime Scene Investigation
|-
|| 2014 || || Strip 'N rip || Discovery Channel ||  || Steve Darnell customizes cars and specializes in rat rods .
|-
|| 2010 || 2016 || American Restoration || History || Leftfield Pictures|| Chronicles the daily activities at Rick's Restorations, an antique restoration store, with its owner Rick Dale, his staff, and teenage son, as they restore various vintage to their original condition.  A spin-off of Pawn Stars .
|-
|| 2004 || 2005 || American Casino ||  || ||  Reality series tracking the daily events of the managers and employees of the Green Valley Ranch Casino.
|-
|| 2012 || 2012 || Bad Girls Club || Oxygen || Bunim/Murray Productions || 
|-
|| 2013 || 2014 || Bad Ink || A&E || Sharp Entertainment || Reality series following tattoo artist and musician Dirk Vermin, owner of Pussykat Tattoo in Las Vegas. 
|-
|| 1977 || 1977 || Blansky's Beauties || ABC ||  || Sitcom canceled after only 13 episodes.  The series was a spin-off of Happy Days. 
|-
|| 1999 || 1999 || Brent Webb's Magic at The Desert Inn ||syndicated || || 
|-
|| 2005 || 2005 || Caesars 24/7 || A&E || || Reality show.
|-
|| 1993 || 1994 || Caesar's Challenge || NBC || || 
|-
|| 2004 || 2004 || The Casino || Fox Network || || Reality television program
|-
||2012 ||  || Casino Confidential ||TLC  ||  || Reality television program showing behind the scenes at Binion's Casino in Downtown Las Vegas 
|-
|| 2004 || 2006 ||Celebrity Poker Showdown || Bravo|| || Texas hold 'em tournament
|-
|| 1982 || || Clive James in Las Vegas || London Weekend Television || || Clive James
|-
|| 1989 ||  || Cops || Fox Network || || several episodes
|-
|| 2012 || || Counting Cars || History || Leftfield Pictures|| Reality series chronicling the daily activities at Count's Kustoms, an automobile restoration and customization company.  A spin-off of Pawn Stars.
|-
|| 1986 || 1988 || Crime Story || NBC || || starring Dennis Farina
|-
|| 2005 || 2010 || Criss Angel Mindfreak|| A&E || ||
|-
|| 2000 || 2015 || CSI: Crime Scene Investigation || CBS || || Crime drama series
|-
|| 2010 || 2011  || The Defenders || CBS ||CBS Productions|| starring Jerry O'Connell and James Belushi. Canceled after one season.
|-
|| 2011 || 2011 || Drew Carey's Improv-A-Ganza || GSN || || 
|-
|| 2004 || 2004 || Dr. Vegas || CBS || || 
|-
|| 1989 || || The Ed Bernstein Show || KSNV-DT || || 
|-
|| 2004|| 2005 || Father of the Pride || NBC || DreamWorks || 13 episodes. Cancelled after one Season. 
|-
|| 2001|| 2006 || Fear Factor || NBC || || several episodes
|-
|| 1992 || 1992 || Hearts Are Wild || CBS || || on Saturday evenings set at the Caesars Palace
|-
|| 2006 || 2010 || Heroes || NBC || || Features a fictional casino called "The Corinthian", owned by mob boss Daniel Linderman; characters of Niki Sanders, D. L. Hawkins, and Micah Sanders are from Las Vegas
|-
|| 2006 || 2007 || High Stakes Poker || GSN || || Poker series focusing on cash games rather than tournaments
|-
|| 1985 || 1985 || Jem || NBC || Hasbro, Marvel Productions, and Sunbow Productions || The Holograms are scheduled to play a concert at a casino in Las Vegas, Nevada. When they discover that the Misfits are their opening act, they start to worry. The Misfits bring along Ashley and use her to lure Aja away, hoping that if Aja isn't there, the Holograms can't play and the Misfits will headline instead. Fortunately, Aja comes back in time, and they perform. Unfortunately, while the girls are on stage Eric Raymond's goons steal the money from the concert and frame Jem. Stormer and Ashley team up to tell the truth, and Jem's name is cleared.
|-
|| 2006 || 2007 || King of Cars || A&E || || 
|-
|| 2006 || || King of Vegas || Spike TV || || 
|-
|| 2003 || 2008 || Las Vegas || NBC || || Comedy-drama series
|-
|| 2006 || || Las Vegas Law || Court TV || || 
|-
|| 2003 || 2003 || Lucky || FX || || Starring John Corbett
|-
|| 2011 || 2011 || The Lying Game || ABC Family ||
|-
|| 1990 || || Married... with Children || Fox Network || || Season 4, episode #16 "You Gotta Know When to Hold Them: Part 1" and episode #17 "You Gotta Know When to Hold Them: Part 2"
|-
|| 2009 || || Pawn Stars || History || Leftfield Pictures|| Produced at the Gold and Silver Pawn Shop, 713 Las Vegas Blvd S
|-
|| 2007 || 2021 || Poker After Dark || NBC || || late night poker television
|-
|| 2002 || 2003 || The Real World: Las Vegas || MTV || || Reality television program
|-
|| 2011 || 2011 || The Real World: Las Vegas (2011) || MTV || || Reality television program
|-
|| 2008 || 2010 || Rehab: Party at the Hard Rock Hotel || truTV || || Reality series of goings on at the Rehab pool party at the Hard Rock Hotel and Casino in Las Vegas
|-
|| 2014 || 2014 || Queen of Hearts || NBC || || Crime drama series
|-
|| 2007 || 2007 || The Surreal Life: Fame Games || VH1 || || Reality television program featuring past contestants of The Surreal Life|-
|| 2011 || 2018 || Tanked || Animal Planet || || Produced at Acrylic Tank Manufacturing, 3451 W . Martin Ave. Suite C
|-
|| 1962 ||1966 || Teenbeat Club || KLAS-TV || ||Interview and Dance Show Production with Steve Miller and Keith Austin, hosts
|-
|| 2005 || 2005 || Tilt || ESPN || ESPN Original Entertainment || Miniseries set in Las Vegas at the fictional World Championship of Poker (an obvious allusion to the World Series of Poker, covered by ESPN)
|-
|| 2002 || 2003 || Vegas Showgirls: Nearly Famous ||  ||  ||
|-
|| 2011 ||  || Vegas Strip || truTV  ||  || Reality television program showing law enforcement officers patrolling the Las Vegas Strip
|-
|| 1978 || 1981 || Vega$ || ABC || || starring Robert Urich
|-
|| 2012 || 2013 || Vegas || CBS || || Premieres September 25, 2012; Tuesdays at 10:00
|-
|| 2007 || - || What Makes it Tick || Fine Living Network / Cooking Channel || NorthSouth Productions || 
|-
|| 2003 || - || World Poker Tour || Travel Channel, NBC ||  || several episodes 
|-
|| 2015 || 2015 || The Player (2015 TV series) || NBC ||  ||Thriller/Drama starring Philip Winchester. Wesley Snipes and Charity Wakefield. 
|-
|| 2021 || - || Hacks  || HBO Max ||  ||Comedy starring Jean Smart. Hannah Einbinder and Carl Clemons-Hopkins. 
|}

Miniseries, specials or individual episodesLucy-Desi Comedy Hour "Lucy Hunts Uranium"What's New, Scooby-Doo? "Riva Ras Regas"Rugrats "Vacation"Ben 10 "Tough Luck"ICarly "iLost My Head in Vegas"Timeless "Atomic City"Modern Family "Las Vegas" Friends "The One in Vegas" Scooby-Doo and Guess Who? "The Cursed Cabinet of Professor Madds Markson!" Family Guy" Roads to Vegas"''

See also
 List of films set in Las Vegas

Las Vegas